The following lists events that happened during 1980 in Zaire.

Incumbents 
 President: Mobutu Sese Seko
 Prime Minister: André Bo-Boliko Lokonga – Jean Nguza Karl-i-Bond

Events

Births 

 30 December - D.J. Mbenga, basketball player

See also

 Zaire
 History of the Democratic Republic of the Congo

References

Sources

 
Years of the 20th century in Zaire
Zaire
Zaire